Staphylinochrous euryphaea is a species of moth of the Anomoeotidae family. It is found in Cameroon and Ghana.

George Hampson's description, based on the male, has both body and wings fulvous orange, with dark brown markings around the edges of the wings.

References

Anomoeotidae
Insects of Cameroon
Insects of West Africa
Moths of Africa

ca:Staphylinochrous euryperialis